Anirudha Srikkanth (born 14 April 1987) is an Indian former professional cricketer. He was born in Madras; his father is cricketer Kris Srikkanth. He has played for Chennai Super Kings and Sunrisers Hyderabad in the Indian Premier League.

An attacking opening batsman, much like his father, Anirudha made his first-class debut in the 2003–04 season as a 16-year-old. He was in and out of the Tamil Nadu Ranji Trophy squad in the following seasons but has enjoyed greater success in the limited-overs format and topped the number of runs scored for India under-19s against the touring England under-19 side in 2004–05. His record in the Twenty20 format has been impressive, finishing the fourth-highest run-scorer in the inter-state Twenty20 in 2007.

He was married to a model, Arthi Venkatesh.

Indian Premier League 
He had played for Chennai Super Kings between 2008 and 2013 in the Indian Premier League. In the 2010 semi-final against Deccan Chargers, he scored 24 runs from 15 deliveries, hitting two sixes and a four. In the 2012 season he scored 18 from six balls in a low scoring match against Rajasthan Royals.

In 2014 he was bought by Sunrisers Hyderabad.

References

External links

Indian cricketers
Tamil Nadu cricketers
1987 births
Living people
Cricketers from Chennai
Sunrisers Hyderabad cricketers
Chennai Super Kings cricketers
South Zone cricketers
India Green cricketers